Life – National Party, formerly known as Christian Democracy – Life and Prosperity - Alliance for Slovakia (KDŽP), is a Christian democratic political party in Slovakia.

History

The split between the Christian Democratic Movement (KDH) and the KDŽP was sparked by a dispute between the presidency of the party and its member Peter Molda. Molda wanted the right to life to be a condition for any future KDH participation in government, a move which was not permitted by the more liberal presidency of the KDH. On the 26 April 2018, Molda attacked this move on Conservative Daily Postoj, a conservative website founded after the 2015 Slovak same-sex marriage referendum, stating "I am amazed that it is said on Christian soil that we will conclude the status quo with the Liberals again" and emphasising that the KDH should be focused on  "the question of life". Alojz Hlina, the president of the KDH, criticised Molda's article on 12 May, with Molda announcing his intent to form a new party the same day.

Alongside Tibor Pénzeš (former assistant deputy of the National Council of the Slovak Republic), Pavol Abrhan (former member of the National Council of the Slovak Republic) and Miroslav Vetrík, Molda began collecting the 10,000 signatures needed to register the party. By 16 January 2019, they had collected over 14,000 signatures, meaning that the party was officially registered on 4 February.

In September 2019, KDŽP and the Slovak National Party entered into a cooperation agreement, signing a memorandum concerning "Life and Homeland". They also expressed their support for March for Life, an anti-abortion event in Slovakia. Their first contested national election was the 2020 parliamentary election, in which 3 candidates were elected on joint tickets with the neo-nazi People's Party Our Slovakia (L'SNS). However, on 27 May 2020, all three members left the ĽSNS parliamentary club due to a dispute with ĽSNS National Council member Milan Mazurek.

Ideology

The ideology of the party is based around Christianity. The party advocates for a ban on abortions, increased support for families with children and financial assistance to the elderly. It also calls for increased environmental protections and the introduction of language lessons to schools.

The party was alleged to be fascist by some liberal mainstream media and their commentators, namely Denník N, however said accusations were disputed even by liberal-leaning National Council MPs, such as Martin Klus.

List of party presidents

References

Political parties in Slovakia
Christian democracy in Europe
Political parties established in 2019
Christian democratic parties in Europe
Christian Democratic Movement breakaway groups